Carl Charles "Squash" Cardarelli (September 18, 1896 or 1897 – April 24, 1953) was an American football center who played for the Akron Pros and Cleveland Bulldogs. He played for the Pros in 1917 and again in 1924 and for the Bulldogs in 1925. He played in three National Football League games but played a total of nine in his career.

References

Akron Pros players
Cleveland Bulldogs players
American football centers
1890s births
1953 deaths